Ferdinando Sanfelice (1675 – 1 April 1748) was an Italian late Baroque architect and painter.

Sanfelice was born in Naples and died there. He was one of the principal architects in Naples in the first half of the 18th century. He was a student of Francesco Solimena.

Sanfelice was known primarily for temporary displays and his secular architecture. The former involved displays such as those set up for royal visits and births as well as for religious celebrations; the latter included a large number of family dwellings in Naples, including his own Palazzo Sanfelice, built between 1723 and 1728, and the Palazzo Serra di Cassano, finished around 1730. Most notable in Sanfelice's architecture are the staircases; rather than being incidental features set off to the side of a courtyard, he gave them central and prominent positions so that they became important architectural features in their own right, often as double staircases.

Sanfelice also worked on churches in Naples, including San Lorenzo Maggiore, San Giovanni a Carbonara, and the chapel of the Nunziatella at the Nunziatella military academy

See also
Santa Maria del Faro, a church in the quartiere of Posillipo of Naples, Italy

References

External links

1675 births
1748 deaths
17th-century Italian painters
Italian male painters
18th-century Italian painters
18th-century Italian architects
Architects from Naples
Italian Baroque architects
18th-century Italian male artists